Tapio Kantanen (born 31 May 1949) is a Finnish former athlete who mainly competed in the 3,000 metre steeple chase.

He competed for Finland at the 1972 Summer Olympics held in Munich, Germany where he won the bronze medal in the 3,000 metres steeplechase event.  He also competed in the 5,000 metres at Munich, but did not qualify for the final.  At the 1976 Summer Olympics in Montreal, Quebec, Canada, he finished fourth in the 3,000 metres steeplechase.

References

External links
 

1949 births
Living people
People from Heinola
Finnish male long-distance runners
Olympic bronze medalists for Finland
Athletes (track and field) at the 1972 Summer Olympics
Athletes (track and field) at the 1976 Summer Olympics
Olympic athletes of Finland
Finnish male steeplechase runners
Medalists at the 1972 Summer Olympics
Olympic bronze medalists in athletics (track and field)
Sportspeople from Päijät-Häme